The Gilgit-Baltistan Chief Court is the court of appeals in the region of Gilgit-Baltistan, Pakistan. The decisions of the court are appealed to Supreme Appellate Court Gilgit-Baltistan. The court acts under 2009 Gilgit-Baltistan Empowerment and Self-Governance Order and has the equal status as of other high courts of Pakistan. The Permanent Seat of the Court is at Gilgit, but the Court also sits from time to time at Skardu Branch Registry.

History 
Prior to 1972, Gilgit Baltistan was then known as Northern Areas was ruled under the infamous FCR, which was abolished in 1972. Ministry of Kashmir Affairs and Gilgit-Baltistan introduced some judicial and administrative reforms and courts were established. These were given more power over time by Al-Jehad Trust Versus the Federation of Pakistan as per orders of Supreme Court of Pakistan. In 2009, under Gilgit-Baltistan (Empowerment and Self Governance Order) 2009 the court in its current form was established.

Judges 
The Court is composed of one Chief Judge and four other judges appointed by Gilgit-Baltistan Council.

Current Composition 
 Chief Justice Justice Malik Nawaz Haq (2020 - to date)
 Justice Ali Baig (2017 - to date)

Former Judges

Former Chief Judges 
 Justice Sahib Khan 
 Justice Muhammad Alam
 Justice Wazir Shakeel Ahmed (Elevated to Supreme Appellate Court Gilgit-Baltistan)

Former Judges 
 Justice Muhammad Umer

See also 
 Gilgit-Baltistan Judicial Academy
 Government of Gilgit-Baltistan
 Gilgit-Baltistan District Courts

References

External links 
 Gilgit Baltistan Chief Court

Judiciary of Gilgit-Baltistan
2009 establishments in Pakistan
Courts and tribunals established in 2009
High Courts of Pakistan